StAR-related lipid transfer protein 5 is a protein that in humans is encoded by the STARD5 gene.  The protein is a 213 amino acids long, consisting almost entirely of a StAR-related transfer (START) domain.  It is also part of the StarD4 subfamily of START domain proteins, sharing 34% sequence identity with STARD4.

Function 

The protein is most prevalent in the kidney and the liver where it is found in Kupffer cells. STARD5 binds both cholesterol and 25-hydroxycholesterol and appears to function to redistribute cholesterol to the endoplasmic reticulum with which the protein associates and/or the plasma membrane.  Increased levels of StarD5 increase free cholesterol in the cell.

Cholesterol homeostasis is regulated, at least in part, by sterol regulatory element (SRE)-binding proteins (e.g., SREBP1) and by liver X receptors (e.g., LXRA). Upon sterol depletion, LXRs are inactive and SREBPs are cleaved, after which they bind promoter SREs and activate genes involved in cholesterol biosynthesis and uptake. Sterol transport is mediated by vesicles or by soluble protein carriers, such as steroidogenic acute regulatory protein (STAR). STAR is homologous to a family of proteins containing a 200- to 210-amino acid STAR-related lipid transfer (START) domain, including STARD5.

Model organisms 

Model organisms have been used in the study of STARD5 function. A conditional knockout mouse line, called Stard5tm1a(KOMP)Wtsi was generated as part of the International Knockout Mouse Consortium program — a high-throughput mutagenesis project to generate and distribute animal models of disease to interested scientists.

Male and female animals underwent a standardized phenotypic screen to determine the effects of deletion. Twenty four tests were carried out on homozygous mutant mice and one significant abnormality was observed: abnormal vertebral transverse processes.

References

Further reading 

 
 
 
 
 
 
 

Genes mutated in mice